was a Japanese actor. He appeared in more than 120 films from 1953 to 1984.

Career
Amachi joined the Shintoho studio as one of its "New Face" actors of 1951 and established himself in action and jidaigeki films. He gained fame for the nihilistic mood of his character in Akatsuki no hijōsen and starred in Nobuo Nakagawa's version of Tokaido Yotsuya kaidan (1959). On television, he played the hardboiled detective in Hijō no raisensu and Kogoro Akechi in a long-running series of TV specials. On stage he was best known for playing Hishakaku in Jinsei gekijō.

Selected filmography

References

External links 

1931 births
1985 deaths
Japanese male film actors